The Armenian Biathlon Federation, is the regulating body of biathlon in Armenia, governed by the Armenian Olympic Committee. The headquarters of the federation is located in Gyumri.

History
Armenian biathlon athletes first participated in biathlon tournaments under the Soviet Union. The Armenian Biathlon Federation was established in 2007. Vardan Grigoryan is the current president. The Federation oversees the training of biathlon specialists and organizes Armenia's participation in European and international level biathlon competitions. The Federation maintains cooperation with the Armenian Ski Federation. The Federation is a full member of the International Biathlon Union.

See also 
 Armenian Shooting Federation
 National Federation of Modern Pentathlon of Armenia
 Sport in Armenia

References 

Sports organizations of Armenia
Sports governing bodies in Armenia
 

Shooting sports organizations